Your World Is Burning is a 2006 album by the Norwegian industrial music project Panzer AG.

Track listing
 “Introduction OTD” – 0:54
 “Aenimal” – 4:22
 “Machinegun GoGo” – 4:01
 “Among the New” – 4:00
 “Paper Angels” – 5:08
 “Monster” – 4:06
 “Moerketio” – 4:32
 “Crash N Burn” – 4:12
 “Not Too Late” – 4:55
 “Tip the Dancer” – 4:04
 “Mother” – 6:09
 “When I Am You” – 5:05

References

2006 albums
Panzer AG albums
Accession Records albums
Metropolis Records albums